Laxminarayan Mishra (11 April 1899 – 30 May 1971) was a supporter of Indian independence and writer from Odisha, India. He was one of the most active nationalists of Western Odisha.

Life
Laxminarayan Mishra was born in the undivided Sambalpur District in the British Raj (present Sambalpur District) of the Odisha state in India on 11 April 1899. He was the third son of Krupasindhu Mishra and Revati Devi. Mishra was from a middle class Brahmin family and went to Gurupada primary school and C.B.S Zilla school in Sambalpur where he was a good student. He was also known to have a rebellious personality.

As a student, he started protesting against the oppressive British rule. He eventually left school to join India’s Freedom Movement. He was also a writer and famed orator. Later he was also arrested by the British forces for his speeches against the British raj. Mishra spoke Odia, Sanskrit, Urdu, Bengali, Telugu, Hindi, and English.

Movements
Mishra was an active nationalist in Western Odisha. He was imprisoned for seventeen years for his role in the independence movement. While in jail he studied religion, culture and political thought.

He was involved in moments such as the non-corporation movement, drive against untouchability, the Nagpur flag march, move against the partial exclusion of the district of Sambalpur, the struggle against the zamindars and the state rulers, and the quit India movement.

Death
He was assassinated during a train journey at Jharsuguda.

Honours
He has been honored as the namesake of various institutions, including Laxminarayan College, Jharsuguda.

References

1899 births
1971 deaths
People from Sambalpur district
History of Sambalpur
Indian independence activists from Odisha
Indian revolutionaries